Seven Lakes Basin is a basin located in the state of Washington, Olympic National Park, 15 miles south of Lake Crescent. The loop trail starts  by following the Sol Duc River near Sol Duc Hot Springs and eventually heads south and begins a rapid elevation gain. The trail winds out of the rain forest and eventually ends at the High Divide, a long steep ridge that runs along the south side of the basin, where there are prime views of Mt. Olympus and the Hoh River valley to the south and the Sol Duc valley to the north. To the east lie glacial fields.

While the basin itself has a barren, lunar landscape it is surrounded by old-growth forest and alpine meadows lush with wildflowers and blueberries. Despite the name, Seven Lakes Basin, there are actually eight small lakes in the area. The lakes are Sol duc, Long, Lunch, Morgenroth, No Name, Clear, Round, and Lake No. 8.  The largest of these lakes is Sol duc and the smallest is Morgenroth. Other lakes are encountered along the way which are not considered part of "seven lakes" include Heart Lake and Deer Lake.  Heart Lake gets its name from its very distinct heart like shape.

Black Bear, mountain goats, marmots, and Olympic Elk are common in this area. Fishing is a popular activity in the area, although there are no fish in Heart Lake and several of the other smaller lakes in the basin.

References

Landforms of Clallam County, Washington
Landforms of Olympic National Park